Kalideres is a district of West Jakarta, Indonesia and is the westernmost district of Jakarta.

As of 2019, Kalideres had an area of 30.23 km2 and a population of 471,436 people  giving a population density of 15,595 people per km2 (38,536 people per sq mi)

Transportation 
Kalideres is serviced by TransJakarta corridor 3 with its 2 stops (Kalideres and Pesakih) and KRL Jabodetabek's Duri-Tangerang Line serving Kalideres Station

Kalideres Bus Terminal is also located in Kalideres.

Kelurahan (Administrative Villages)
Kalideres is divided into five kelurahan or administrative villages:
Kamal - area code 11810
Tegal Alur - area code 11820
Pegadungan - area code 11830
Kalideres - area code 11840
Semanan - area code 11850

References

Districts of Jakarta
West Jakarta